Danny Gabriel Carvajal Rodríguez (born 8 January 1989) is a Costa Rican footballer who plays for Japanese club FC Ryukyu as a goalkeeper. He was a Costa Rica national player for many championships.

Club career
Born in San Ramón, Carvajal was a Deportivo Saprissa youth graduate. He made his first team debut for Brujas F.C. on 6 December 2009 by coming on as a second-half substitute in a 0–0 away draw against A.D. Ramonense.

Carvajal started to appear more regularly during the 2010–11 season, contributing with 12 appearances. In July 2011, after leaving the club after the end of the campaign due to economic problems, he joined fellow league team A.D. San Carlos.

Carvajal was an undisputed starter for San Carlos during his two-year spell, and on 15 May 2013 he returned to Saprissa, now assigned to the first team. Initially a backup to Donny Grant and Luis Ernesto Michel in his first campaign, he subsequently became first-choice and featured regularly in the following three years.

On 29 June 2017, Carvajal moved abroad for the first time in his career, signing for Segunda División side Albacete Balompié and becoming the third Costa Rican goalkeeper to represent the club (after Luis Conejo and Keylor Navas). The following 16 January, however, he was loaned to Tokushima Vortis until the end of the year.

International career
Carvajal was called up to Costa Rica under-20s ahead of the 2009 FIFA U-20 World Cup, but was only a backup to Esteban Alvarado during the tournament. In June 2011 he was included in the main side's squad ahead of 2011 Copa América, but again remained a second-choice to Alvarado.

Carvajal was also called up to 2015 CONCACAF Gold Cup, Copa América Centenario, 2017 Copa Centroamericana and 2017 CONCACAF Gold Cup, mainly behind Alvarado and Navas. He only made his full international debut on 18 January 2017, starting in a 0–0 draw against Nicaragua.

Honours
Brujas
Liga FPD: 2009 Invierno

Saprissa
Liga FPD: 2014 Verano, 2014 Invierno, 2015 Invierno, 2016 Invierno
Costa Rican Cup: 2013

References

External links

1989 births
Living people
People from San Ramón, Costa Rica
Costa Rican footballers
Association football goalkeepers
Liga FPD players
Brujas FC players
A.D. San Carlos footballers
Deportivo Saprissa players
Segunda División players
Albacete Balompié players
J2 League players
Tokushima Vortis players
Mito HollyHock players
FC Ryukyu players
2011 Copa América players
2015 CONCACAF Gold Cup players
Copa América Centenario players
2017 Copa Centroamericana players
2017 CONCACAF Gold Cup players
Costa Rica international footballers
Costa Rican expatriate footballers
Costa Rican expatriate sportspeople in Spain
Costa Rican expatriate sportspeople in Japan
Expatriate footballers in Spain
Expatriate footballers in Japan